Saint-Colomban is a city in the regional county municipality of La Rivière-du-Nord in Québec, Canada. It is situated in the Laurentides region of Québec and was named in honour of Saint Columbanus.

The pioneer responsible for developing the village was the priest John Falvey, who constructed the parish and preached to the first parishioners.

Saint-Colomban was also the birthplace of Mr. Justice Emmett Hall, a justice of the Supreme Court of Canada widely considered to be one of the fathers of Medicare.

Demographics 

Education
The Commission scolaire de la Rivière-du-Nord operates French-language public schools.
 École à l'Orée-des-Bois
 École de la Volière
 École des Hautbois
 École Mer-et-Monde
 The primary schools Bellefeuille and Prévost in Saint-Jérôme serve other sections
 École secondaire Émilien-Frenette and École polyvalente Saint-Jérôme, both in Saint-Jérôme

The Sir Wilfrid Laurier School Board operates English-language public schools:
 Laurentian Elementary School in Lachute
 Laurentian Regional High School in Lachute

Sources 

  Répertoire des municipalités du Québec
  Commission de toponymie du Québec
  Affaires municipales et régions - cartes régionales

External links 

  Site officiel Saint-Colomban
  Site dedicated to Irish history of the original settlers

Incorporated places in Laurentides
Cities and towns in Quebec
Greater Montreal